Copilco is a station along Line 3 on the Mexico City Metro. Located in the Coyoacán borough, in the south of Mexico City, on Avenida Enríquez Ureña (Eje 10 Sur). It is the penultimate station along the southern portion of Line 3.

General information
The station logo depicts an Olmec representation of a coiled water snake or dragon (symbols of the lightbug, which is also a personification of the God of Water). Copilco means "in the Royal Crown" in Nahuatl. The station opened on 30 August 1983.

Above the station's platforms is the mural El perfil del tiempo by Guillermo Ceniceros, depicting paintings and art from ancient pre-Hispanic cultures, works by famous artists such as Leonardo da Vinci, and Mexican art from José Guadalupe Posada, Diego Rivera and others. This station also has a cultural display.

Many of the passengers are students, headed for the nearby campus of the National Autonomous University of Mexico (UNAM). Metro Copilco is particularly close to the schools of medicine and dentistry. This station serves the Copilco Universidad, Romero de Terreros, Copilco el Alto and Pedregal de Santo Domingo neighborhoods, as well as several estates (closed groups of high-density residential buildings), such as Integración Latinoamericana and Copilco 300.

Nearby
School of Odontology, UNAM
School of Economics, UNAM
School of Chemistry, UNAM
School of Engineering, UNAM
Central Library of the National Autonomous University of Mexico (UNAM)

Exits
Southeast: Cerro Tres Zapotes street and Eje 10 Sur Enríquez Ureña, Romero de Terreros
Southwest: Cerro Tlapacoya street and Eje 10 Sur Enríquez Ureña, Romero de Terreros
North: Eje 10 Sur Enríquez Ureña, Romero de Terreros

Gallery

Ridership

References

External links 
 

Copilco
Railway stations opened in 1983
Mexico City Metro stations in Coyoacán
1983 establishments in Mexico
Accessible Mexico City Metro stations
Railway stations in Mexico at university and college campuses